Reyazul Haque Raju is an Indian Politician from Rashtriya Janata Dal.He entered Politics when he was a student and contested the Assembly Election from Gopalganj Sadar on RJD ticket in 2010 & 2015 and in 2020 He is Contested from Barauli, Gopalganj.

References

Bihar MLAs 1990–1995
Janata Dal (United) politicians
Living people
People from Gopalganj district, India
Year of birth missing (living people)